Siyi (Seiyap or Sze Yup in Cantonese;  meaning "Four Hamlets") is a coastal branch of Yue Chinese spoken mainly in Guangdong province, but is also used in overseas Chinese communities. Within the province, it is mainly spoken in the prefecture-level city of Jiangmen, but pockets exist outside Jiangmen, including the Doumen and Jinwan districts in Zhuhai, Guzhen in Zhongshan and Jun'an in Foshan. Taishanese, which was one of the most important Chinese dialects in Chinese American communities, is considered a representative dialect.

Etymology

The name "Sze Yup" or "Seiyap" refers to the historical four counties of Jiangmen prefecture: Xinhui, Taishan, Enping and Kaiping.

Since a fifth county, Heshan, was added to the prefecture in 1983, this region is referred to as the "Five Counties" in the province; but for historical reasons, the term "Seiyap" is still used amongst the overseas Chinese communities.

It has also been called Delta Cantonese because all the aforementioned counties are in the Pearl River Delta.

Geographic distribution
The Siyi dialect is mainly distributed along the drainage basin of the Tan river, as well as part of the region west of the main stream of the Xi River, near to the confluence of the two rivers. Most of the region in which Siyi is spoken is administered by the prefecture-level city of Jiangmen, including the Jiangmen city districts of Jianghai, Pengjiang and Xinhui, as well as the county-level cities of Taishan, Kaiping, Enping and the southeastern part of Heshan, but the dialect is also spoken in parts of Zhuhai, the town of Guzhen in Zhongshan and the town of Jun'an in Foshan. In terms of geographic extremes, Siyi is spoken furthest north in Yayao (雅瑶), Heshan; furthest south in Xiachuan Island, Taishan; furthest east in Hongqi (红旗), Zhuhai; and furthest west in Naji (那吉), Enping. The total geographic area of the region is approximately 9000 square kilometers and the total number of speakers is estimated at about 3.9 million in 2010.

References

Further reading

 
 

Yue Chinese
Articles containing video clips